Langenbrettach is a town in the district of Heilbronn in Baden-Württemberg in Germany.

The two towns Brettach and Langenbeutingen were combined in 1975.

References

Heilbronn (district)